Michael Leopold Kilby (3 September 1924 – 9 September 2008) was a British Conservative politician who served as a Member of the European Parliament for Nottingham between 1984 and 1989.

Prior to his election as a Member of the European Parliament, he had served as the Mayor of Dunstable in 1963–64. A keen cricketer, he played minor counties cricket for Bedfordshire from 1950–55, making 21 appearances in the Minor Counties Championship. He died in September 2008 at Hawkhurst, Kent.

References

1924 births
2008 deaths
People from Dunstable
English cricketers
Bedfordshire cricketers
Conservative Party (UK) councillors
Conservative Party (UK) MEPs
Mayors of places in Bedfordshire
MEPs for England 1984–1989